Europa Plus (formally Europa Plus Social Movement) was a pro-European centre-left coalition of parties in Poland, formed to contest the 2014 European Parliament election. The alliance described itself as a "modern centre-left formation".

The coalition was founded on 3 February 2013 by the Palikot's Movement, Social Democracy of Poland, Labour United, the Union of the Left and the Reason Party. The project was led by Marek Siwiec (a former Vice President of the Democratic Left Alliance and then-current MEP), Aleksander Kwasniewski (a former President of Poland and member of the Democratic Left Alliance) and Janusz Palikot. However, on 15 June 2013, Labour United congress instead stated it would continue its previous coalition with the Democratic Left Alliance. The Democratic Party – demokraci.pl later joined the alliance on 24 June 2013. Other parties listed in the alliance's website are the Democratic Party and the Polish Labour Party. The alliance's programme supported the introduction of the Euro to Poland by January 2019, a new system of health care in Poland and free Internet access for Polish citizens. On 6 October 2013, Palikot's Movement was reorganised into Your Movement. On 7 February 2014, the Union of the Left and Social Democracy of Poland exited the alliance.

In the 2014 European election, Europa Plus received 3.58% of the vote, below the 5% threshold to elect any MEPs. On 29 May 2014, it was announced that the alliance had been disbanded.

References

External links
Official website
Official website (English version)

2013 establishments in Poland
Defunct political party alliances in Poland
Political parties established in 2013